Terry Smith (born Terence Edwin Smith in Geelong, Victoria, 1944) is an Australian art historian, art critic and artist who currently lives and works in Pittsburgh, New York and Sydney.

Since 2001 he has been Andrew W. Mellon Professor of Contemporary Art History and Theory in the Department of the History of Art and Architecture at the University of Pittsburgh. He also serves as a board member of The Andy Warhol Museum, Pittsburgh.

Education
Smith was a student at Melbourne High School, where he won a General Exhibition in the 1962 Matriculation examinations. Between 1963 and 1967, he studied at the University of Melbourne, where he studied art history under Professor Sir Joseph Burke, Franz Philipp and Bernard Smith. When the Power Institute was established at the University of Sydney in 1968, he tutored to professors Bernard Smith, David Saunders and Donald Brook.

Winning a Harkness Fellowship in 1972, he studied at the Institute of Fine Arts, New York, under professors Goldwater, Rubin and Rosenblum, and at Columbia University under Professor Meyer Schapiro. While in New York, he joined the Art & Language group of conceptual artists, including Joseph Kosuth, Ian Burn, Mel Ramsden and Michael Corris, and remained an active member 1972–1976.

Returning to Australia in 1975, he taught contemporary art and art historical method in the Fine Arts Department at the University of Melbourne and at the Art School, Preston Institute of Technology. His Master of Arts thesis on "American Abstract Expressionism: ethical attitudes and moral function" received the University Medal in 1976 from the University of Sydney.

Career
Appointed a lecturer at the Power Institute of Fine Arts in 1976, Smith remained until 2001, becoming Power Professor of Contemporary Art and Director of the Power Institute, Foundation for Art and Visual Culture from 1994. During his tenure, the Institute became an international centre for the study of contemporary visual cultures. He was a founding board member of the Museum of Contemporary Art, Sydney, and remained on that Board until 2001.

When Ian Burn and Nigel Lendon returned to Australia in 1976, Smith joined with them to found Media Action Group, which soon was augmented by others, including Ian Milliss, and became Union Media Services (Sydney), an independent, artist-run organisation that provided graphic art services to the union movement and dissident groups. Smith wrote art criticism for the Weekend Australian, Nation Review, The Times on Sunday, as well a number of articles for local and international journals, now numbering over 100.

Smith's 1986 doctoral dissertation became Making the Modern: Industry, Art and Design in America (University of Chicago Press, 1993), winner of the inaugural Georgia O'Keeffe Museum Prize in 2009 for the best book on modern American art published in the past 25 years. The committee of jurors for the book prize they chose Smith's book because of its "excellence of writing and scholarship, its originality and its outstanding and multi-faceted exploration of the emergence and flourishing of modernism as a phenomenon in American art and culture."

Smith contributed three chapters to Bernard Smith's classic text Australian Painting 1788–1990 (Melbourne: Oxford University Press, 1991) and wrote lengthy studies of key works and themes in Australian art. These are collected in the two volumes Transformations in Australian Art, volume 1, The Nineteenth Century: Landscape, Colony and Nation, volume 2, The Twentieth Century: Modernism and Aboriginality (Craftsman House, Sydney, 2002; joint winner of the Power Institute/Art Association of Australia and New Zealand Book Prize, 2003).

He also edited many other books, including In Visible Touch: Modernism and Masculinity (Power Publications and the University of Chicago Press, 1997), First People, Second Chance: The Humanities and Aboriginal Australia (Australian Academy of the Humanities, 1999), Impossible Presence: Surface and Screen in the Photogenic Era (Power Publications and the University of Chicago Press, 2001), with Paul Patton, Jacques Derrida, Deconstruction Engaged: The Sydney Seminars (Power Publications, 2001; Japanese edition, Tokyo: Iwanami Shoten, 2005), and Contemporary Art + Philanthropy (University of NSW Press, 2007).

In 1996, Smith was elected a Fellow of the Australian Academy of the Humanities and a Membre titulaire, Comité International d'Histoire de l'Art, serving as the Australian representative and Vice-President of the latter 1999–2003. He has been a visiting professor at the Universities of California, San Diego, Chicago, Duke University, Pennsylvania, Queensland, and is currently a Visiting Professor in the Faculty of Architecture, Design and Planning at the University of Sydney. Smith has also been awarded a number of prestigious research fellowships including, in recent years, being named a Getty Scholar at the Getty Research Institute, Los Angeles 2001-2; Fondation de France Chercheur Invité at the Institut national d'histoire de l'art, Paris, 2007; and GlaxoSmithKlein Senior Fellow at the National Humanities Center, Research Triangle Park, Raleigh-Durham, NC.

Smith's current work explores the relationships between contemporary art and its wider settings, within a world picture that he believes is characterised above all by its contemporaneity. His findings are being presented in a series of books. These include The Architecture of Aftermath (University of Chicago Press, 2006); Antinomies of Art and Culture: Modernity, postmodernity and contemporaneity (edited with Nancy Condee and Okwui Enwezor, and published by Duke University Press, 2008); and What is Contemporary Art? (University of Chicago Press, 2009). He is working on Contemporary Art of the World: Late Modern to Now (Laurence King and Pearson/Prentice-Hall, 2011).

Awards
Smith was named by the College Art Association as the 2010 winner of the Frank Jewett Mather Award for distinction in art criticism. The announcement reads:

Terry Smith is that rare art and social historian able to write criticism at once alert to the forces that contextualise art and sensitive to the elements and qualities that inhere to the works of art themselves. His most recent book, What Is Contemporary Art? (Chicago: University of Chicago Press, 2009), contains a series of interrelated essays that unpack a vast range of topics and issues and take the reader on a theoretical tour through some of the world's most influential art museums, laying bare their conflicted missions and studying the heightening distinction, and dispute, between modern and contemporary art.

Publications

Terry Smith, "The Provincialism Problem", Artforum, Sept. 1974, pp. 54–9.
 Terry Smith, What is Contemporary Art? Chicago: University of Chicago Press, 2009
 Terry Smith, Okwui Enwezor and Nancy Condee editors, Antinomies of Art and Culture: Modernity, Postmodernity, Contemporaneity, Durham, NC: Duke University Press, 2008
 Terry Smith, editor, Contemporary Art + Philanthropy, Sydney: University of New South Wales Press for the Sherman Foundation, 2007
 Terry Smith, The Architecture of Aftermath, Chicago: University of Chicago Press, 2006
 Terry Smith, Transformations in Australian Art, vol. 1, The Nineteenth Century: Landscape, Colony and Nation; vol. 2. The Twentieth Century: Modernism and Aboriginality, Sydney: Craftsman House, 2002
 Terry Smith Editor, Paul Patton editors,Jacques Derrida, Deconstruction Engaged: The Sydney Seminars Sydney: Power Publications, 2001; Japanese edition, Tokyo: Iwanami Shoten, 2005
 Terry Smith, What is Contemporary Art? Contemporary Art, Contemporaneity and Art to Come, Sydney, Artspace Critical Issues Series, 2001
 Terry Smith, editor, Impossible Presence: Surface and Screen in the Photogenic Era, Sydney, Power Publications, Chicago, University of Chicago Press, 2001
 Terry Smith, editor,First People, Second Chance; The Humanities and Aboriginal Australia, Canberra, Australian Academy of the Humanities, 1999
 Terry Smith, editor, with Jennifer Allison, Katherine Gregouras, George Symons,From Vision to Sesquicentenary, The University of Sydney through its Art Collection, Sydney, Standing Committee of Convocation of the University of Sydney, 1999
 Terry Smith, editor, In Visible Touch: Modernism and Masculinity, Sydney, Power Publications, 1997, Chicago, University of Chicago Press, 1998
 Terry Smith, editor, Ideas of the University, Sydney: Research Institute for the Humanities and Social Sciences and Power Publications, 1996
 Terry Smith, Making the Modern: Industry, Art and Design in America, Chicago: University of Chicago Press, 1993
 Terry Smith, editor, Constructing Australian Art: Eight Critiques, Sydney: Power Institute of Fine Arts Occasional Paper No 2, May 1986
 Terry Smith and Anthony Bradley editors, Australian Art and Architecture: Essays Presented to Bernard Smith, Oxford University Press, Melbourne 1980)
 Terry Smith, editor, Art & Language: Australia 1975, Art & Language Press, Banbury, New York, Sydney 1976
 Terry Smith, Ian Burn and Mel Ramsden, Draft for an Anti-Textbook, special issue, Art-Language, Vol.3, No 1 (Sept 1974)
 Terry Smith, Ian Burn, Mel Ramsden, et al., Handbook (Art & Language Press, New York, and the Mezzanine, Nova Scotia College of Art, Halifax, N.S. 1973

References

External links
Terry Smith
Terry Smith at the University of Pittsburgh

Australian artists
Australian art historians
Art & Language
Living people
Academic staff of the University of Sydney
1944 births
Frank Jewett Mather Award winners
University of Pittsburgh faculty
New York University Institute of Fine Arts alumni